During the spring and early summer of 1973, Paul McCartney's band Wings performed on a twelve-city concert tour of the United Kingdom.

Promotion
The tour was for the purpose of promoting the band's latest album, Red Rose Speedway, as well as the single "Live and Let Die" from the James Bond film of the same name. Another reason for the tour was that McCartney simply enjoying playing live shows.  

This was the largest tour yet for Wings. Unlike the surprise appearances of the previous year's Wings University Tour and the spontaneous nature of the follow-up Wings Over Europe Tour, here the tour was announced in more normal fashion and fans could buy tickets ahead of time. Tickets sold well, with a third date being added at the Hammersmith Odeon and other cities being added onto the itinerary. The routing included a return to McCartney's hometown as the band played the Liverpool Empire Theatre on 18 May. 

The announced nature of the tour also meant that music critics could arrange to see the shows, and while the press's regard for McCartney and the Wings enterprise in general was fairly low, the concerts got some mixed-to-good notices. 

Wings' line-up for the tour was Paul and Linda McCartney, Denny Laine, Henry McCullough, and Denny Seiwell.  Shows lasted for around an hour or so.  Wings presented a different image on stage during the tour's shows than they did on record, being respectively "undeniably vigorous and invigorating" rather than "tame, even lame," as Tony Palmer wrote for The Observer after seeing the tour's opening night at the Bristol Hippodrome. The band had somewhat more material to play than they had in previous outings, and McCullough's instrumental "Henry's Blue", previously used to fill out the setlist, was not employed. Laine's singing of his former band The Moody Blues' hit "Go Now" was included, however.

As per McCartney's practice with Wings at the time, the three non-McCartney band members did not earn a share of the receipts but rather received a flat rate of £70 a week, with a £1000 bonus paid at the tour's conclusion.  This reinforced the financial dissatisfaction that Seiwell was feeling with vaguely promised royalties from Wings' recordings not coming to him.  McCullough was also unhappy with the monetary situation and furthermore resented having to share the stage with Linda McCartney.  Although her keyboard playing had improved from before, she still qualified as a musical amateur.  Overall, the group began coming apart during the tour. The situation with Seiwell and McCollough would soon reach a breaking point in the weeks immediately afterward, and both quit Wings shortly before the group left for Lagos, Nigeria to record Band on the Run. 

The support act for the entire tour was pub rock band Brinsley Schwarz. Paul and Linda asked them to be on the tour after seeing them perform at the London Hard Rock Cafe's opening night a few weeks previously. Prior to the tour, Wings had performed unannounced at the Hard Rock on 18 March in support of the charity organisation Release.

During a break in the tour itinerary, the McCartneys went exploring and ended up buying a secluded house, Waterfall, in Peasmarsh, Surrey, which would end up becoming their main residence.

Tour dates

A source:

Tour set list

References

Cited bibliography
 
 
 

1973 concert tours
Wings (band) concert tours
1973 in the United Kingdom
May 1973 events in the United Kingdom
June 1973 events in the United Kingdom
Concert tours of the United Kingdom